B'z The Best "Pleasure II" is the sixth compilation album by the Japanese rock duo B'z. The album  sold very well and reached 1st at Oricon, with almost 1.2 million copies sold.

Track listing 
Ocean

Ai no Bakudan (愛のバクダン)
Ultra Soul
Home
Itsuka no Meriikurisumasu (いつかのメリークリスマス)
Atsuki Kodou no Hate (熱き鼓動の果て)
Yasei no Energy (野性のEnergy)
It's Showtime!!
Juice
May
Giri Giri chop (ｷﾞﾘｷﾞﾘ Chop)
Ring
Banzai
Arigato
Gold

Certifications

References

External links 
 B'z official website

B'z compilation albums
Being Inc. compilation albums
2005 compilation albums